Enfidha–Hammamet International Airport  is an airport in Enfidha, Tunisia, located about 40 kilometres (25 miles) southwest from the town of Hammamet. The airport is mostly used by European airlines bringing travellers to Tunisian holiday resorts.

History
Construction began in 2007 and the airport opened on 1 December 2009 with the first flight on 4 December 2009. The total building costs were given as 436 million euros.

It was originally named after the former Tunisian president, Zine El Abidine Ben Ali. On 15 January 2011, one day after he left the country due to the social protests against his long dictatorship, his name and his pictures were removed from the airport building. The new name is Enfidha–Hammamet International Airport.

Transport
A bus exists from the airport to the nearby town of Enfidha and departs on the hour from the airport (during the hours of business). As of January 2023, the fee is 500 millimes (€0.15) and takes approximately 15 minutes. From Enfidha, louages (shared taxis) can be taken to Tunis or Sousse.

Airlines and destinations
The following airlines operate regular scheduled and charter flights at Enfidha–Hammamet Airport:

Statistics

References

External links
Official website
Tunisian Civil Aviation Office: information on Enfidha Airport

2009 establishments in Tunisia
Airports established in 2009
Airports in Tunisia